Edward Shawcross is a British historian. He studied at Oxford University and University College London, obtaining his PhD from the latter. His research focused on French imperialism in Latin America, and intellectual trends in the Second Mexican Empire. His first book The Last Emperor of Mexico, based on the life of Emperor Maximilian, was acclaimed in the British press.

His book The Last Emperor of Mexico was extremely well received. Not only did it receive praise from the Wall Street Journal, and fellow author Martyn Rady, but most notably, Shawcross’ book was listed in the Sunday Times Best History Books of the Year 2022.

References

British historians
Living people
Year of birth missing (living people)